Carly Rae Jepsen (born November 21, 1985) is a Canadian singer and songwriter. After studying musical theatre for most of her school life and while in university, Jepsen garnered mainstream attention after placing third on the fifth season of Canadian Idol in 2007. In 2008, Jepsen released her folk-influenced debut studio album Tug of War in Canada before it was internationally released in 2011. 

Jepsen's breakthrough came in 2012 with her acclaimed single "Call Me Maybe", being declared the best-selling single of that year, selling over 18 million copies, reaching number one in more than 19 countries, and leading to major record deals with Schoolboy Records and Interscope Records. Jepsen's sophomore studio album, Kiss, released later that year and included the single "Good Time" with Owl City, charting in the top ten in Canada and the United States. In 2014, Jepsen made her Broadway theatre stage debut, playing the titular character in Cinderella for 12 weeks. The following year, she released her third studio album, Emotion, influenced by 1980s music, dance-pop and synth-pop, which included the singles, "I Really Like You", "Your Type" and "Run Away with Me". In 2016, Jepsen performed in the television special Grease: Live and voiced in the animated film Ballerina. Her fourth studio album, Dedicated, which included the singles "Party for One", "Now That I Found You", and "No Drug Like Me", was released in 2019, along with a B-side follow-up titled Dedicated Side B a year later. Her sixth studio album, The Loneliest Time, which includes the singles "Western Wind" and "Beach House", was released in October 2022.

Jepsen has received three Juno Awards, three  Billboard Music Awards, and an Allan Slaight Award, in addition to nominations for the Grammy Awards, MTV Video Music Awards, Polaris Music Prize and People's Choice Awards.

Biography

1985−2006: Early life and career beginnings
Jepsen was born on November 21, 1985 in Mission, British Columbia to Alexandra and Larry Jepsen, the second of their three children. She is of Danish, English and Scottish descent. Jepsen has an older brother, Colin, and a younger sister, Katie. She attended Heritage Park Secondary School and had a passion for musical theatre, appearing in student productions of Annie where she played Annie, Grease where she played Sandy Olsson, and The Wiz where she played Dorothy Gale. Her parents and stepparents were teachers, so Jepsen considered a career in music instruction as a second option. She applied to music-related programs, including those at Capilano University and the University of British Columbia, but on the advice of her high school drama teacher, she auditioned for the Canadian College of Performing Arts in Victoria, British Columbia and was one of 25 female students to gain admission into its year-long program in 2004.

After graduation, Jepsen relocated to Vancouver's west side and held several jobs, including a barista, assistant pastry chef, and bartender. At this time, she slept on a pull-out sofa and wrote songs in her spare time.

2007–2010: Canadian Idol and Tug of War

In 2007, Jepsen was convinced to audition for Canadian Idol by her high school drama teacher. In the audition, she performed her original song "Sweet Talker". In the competition, she finished in third place, which she considered the best possible outcome in retrospect. Her demo recording attracted the attention of music manager Jonathan Simkin, who signed Jepsen to a management deal with 604 Records that year. Jepsen released her debut single, a cover of John Denver's song "Sunshine on My Shoulders", in June 2008. Her debut studio album, Tug of War, was released in September 2008, and sold 10,000 copies in Canada. The singles "Tug of War" and "Bucket" peaked in the top 40 of the Canadian Hot 100, and received Gold certifications for sales of 40,000 units each. "Sour Candy", a duet with Josh Ramsay of Marianas Trench was released as the final single. In 2009, Jepsen toured western Canada with Marianas Trench and Shiloh.

Canadian Idol performances

2011–2014: Mainstream success with Curiosity and Kiss

In the summer of 2011, Jepsen recorded material for her second studio album with Josh Ramsay, Ryan Stewart, and Tavish Crowe. The track "Call Me Maybe", co-written by Crowe, was released in September 2011. The song received a promotion from fellow Canadian pop singer Justin Bieber, leading Bieber's manager, Scooter Braun, to sign Jepsen to a joint worldwide recording contract with his label, Schoolboy Records, and major label Interscope Records. "Call Me Maybe" reached number one on the Canadian Hot 100, making Jepsen the fourth Canadian artist to top the chart. In the US, the single spent nine weeks at number one on the Billboard Hot 100, earning the title "Song of the Summer" from Billboard magazine. The single was the best-selling single of 2012 worldwide and topped the charts in 19 countries, including the United Kingdom, where it was the year's second best-selling single. The song was included on Jepsen's six-track EP, Curiosity, released in February 2012 in Canada. Following the success of "Call Me Maybe", Jepsen recorded the top ten duet "Good Time" with Owl City, released in June 2012.

Jepsen's second studio album, Kiss, was released in September 2012 and reached the top ten chart positions in Australia, the UK, Canada and the US. The album received music recording certifications of Silver in the UK and Gold in Canada. The album also included the singles "This Kiss" and "Tonight I'm Getting Over You". The same year, Jepsen became a spokesperson and model for clothing retailer Wet Seal and appeared on the fifth-season premiere episode of The CW primetime soap opera 90210. At the 2012 Billboard Music Awards, Jepsen was the first Canadian recipient of the Rising Star Award while Call Me Maybe later received nominations for Song of the Year and Best Pop Solo Performance at the 55th Annual Grammy Awards. 

In January 2013, Jepsen became a spokesperson for clothing and footwear brand Candie's. She released new ads for the brand in July 2013. In April 2013, at the Juno Awards of 2013, Kiss won the awards for Album of the Year and Pop Album of the Year. "Call Me Maybe" won in the Single of the Year category. In June 2013, Kiss: The Remix, a compilation album containing remixes and instrumentals of singles from Kiss, was released in Japan and peaked at number 157 on the Oricon albums chart. From June to October 2013, Jepsen embarked on The Summer Kiss Tour in North America and Asia. 

In Spring 2014, she performed in the Broadway theatre production of Rodgers and Hammerstein's Cinderella for 12 weeks. In June 2014, Jepsen won the International Achievement Award at the SOCAN Awards alongside co-writers Josh Ramsay and Tavish Crowe.

2015–2017: Emotion and other projects

Jepsen released her third album's lead single, "I Really Like You", in March 2015. Accompanied by a music video in which actor Tom Hanks lip-synced to the song, it peaked at number 14 in Canada and the top five in the UK. The studio album, titled Emotion, was released in June 2015. Although it was a relative commercial failure compared to Kiss, it received critical acclaim and a cult following, attracting a more mature audience to her music. The album peaked at number eight in Canada and at number 16 on the US Billboard 200. It includes collaborations with Rostam Batmanglij, Sia, Dev Hynes, Greg Kurstin, and Ariel Rechtshaid. The second single, "Run Away with Me", was released in July 2015. In November 2015, Jepsen embarked on the Gimmie Love Tour in support of Emotion. Jepsen was featured on a new version of Bleachers' song "Shadow" from their album Terrible Thrills, Vol. 2 and released a cover of Wham!'s "Last Christmas". In December 2015, Jepsen recorded the theme song for the Netflix series Fuller House, a remake of the theme to Full House.

In January 2016, Jepsen played Frenchy in Grease Live!, Fox's live television presentation of the musical Grease. As part of her role, she performed a new song entitled "All I Need Is an Angel". In March 2016, she appeared on the Knocks' debut studio album 55. In August 2016, Jepsen released Emotion: Side B, an EP containing eight cut tracks from Emotion. The EP received critical acclaim from Rolling Stone and Pitchfork. In May 2017, Jepsen released the single "Cut to the Feeling". The song was originally intended for Emotion, but instead appeared in the animated film Ballerina, in which Jepsen voices a supporting role. It also appeared on the Japanese deluxe version of the Side B EP.

2018–2020: Dedicated
In early 2018, Jepsen appeared as the opening act for Katy Perry's Witness: The Tour. "Party for One", the lead single from Jepsen's fourth studio album, was released in November 2018. Two more singles, "Now That I Found You" and "No Drug Like Me" followed in February 2019, with "Julien" and "Too Much" being released as the fourth and fifth respective singles. By then, Braun was no longer Jepsen's manager, although she was still signed to Schoolboy Records.

Her fourth studio album, Dedicated, was released on May 17, 2019, with a tour beginning June 27. Jepsen performed a NPR Tiny Desk Concert in November 2019. On May 21, 2020, the companion album Dedicated Side B was released, containing twelve additional tracks from Dedicated. In October 2020, Jepsen released "It's Not Christmas Till Somebody Cries" which peaked at 11 on the US Holiday Digital Songs chart.

2021–present: The Loneliest Time and TikTok virality
Following Dedicated Side Bs release, Jepsen confirmed that she was making a "quarantine album" alongside long-time friend and songwriter Tavish Crowe, whom she wrote "Call Me Maybe" with. In May 2022, Jepsen announced at her Coachella performance the lead single from her sixth studio album, "Western Wind", which was released on 6 May 2022. On 3 August 2022, Jepsen announced via her social media the release of her sixth studio album, The Loneliest Time, released on 21 October 2022, and shortly after released the second single from the album, "Beach House" and the third single "Talking to Yourself" the following month. The title track featuring Rufus Wainwright, was the fourth and final single for the album, releasing on 8 October 2022. On social media platform TikTok, the song became a viral success amassing nearly 200,000 videos since its release, and amongst those videos celebrities such as Meghan Trainor. Following the album's release, the album debuted at number 18 on the Canadian Albums Chart, number 19 on the  Billboard 200, and number 16 on the UK Albums Chart, becoming her highest charting album in the UK in ten years. In support and for the promotion of the album, Jepsen embarked on The So Nice Tour beginning in September 2022 and is scheduled to play 40 shows across North America, Europe, and Australia through March 2023. Jepsen performed the theme song for the Amazon Kids+ series Hello Kitty: Super Style!, which debuted in December 2022.

Artistry

Musical style
Jepsen has been noted for her "subversively catchy lyrics, slick musical arrangements, and pop experimentation". Jepsen is classified as a soprano. Paul Bradley of LA Weekly described Jepsen's voice as "hushed" and "flawless" while Maura Johnston of Slate characterized it as "airy yet precise".

Jepsen says she shares her parents' interest in folk music as a result of her upbringing, naming artists such as Leonard Cohen, Bruce Springsteen, James Taylor, and Van Morrison as inspirations for her debut studio album, Tug of War (2008). During the recording of her EP Curiosity and her second studio album, Kiss (both 2012), Jepsen said she became increasingly influenced by pop and dance music, in particular the works of Dragonette, Kimbra, La Roux, and Robyn. Her third studio album, Emotion (2015), drew from her love of 1980s pop artists including Cyndi Lauper, Madonna, and Prince.

Jepsen has expressed admiration for Cat Power, Christine and the Queens, Tegan and Sara, Bleachers, Kate Bush, Bob Dylan, Sky Ferreira, Dev Hynes, Solange Knowles, Joni Mitchell, Sinéad O'Connor, the Spice Girls, and Hank Williams.

Impact

Jepsen has been referred to as the "Queen of Pop" or similar epithets in articles for NPR, Stereogum, Time, and BBC.

Jepsen has been referred to as a queer icon, having performed at several pride parades and with the majority of the audience at her performances usually being gay men in their 30s. In March 2013, Jepsen pulled out of performing at the Boy Scouts of America 2013 National Scout Jamboree due its policy on homosexuality.

In 2022, Jepsen added a studio to her home in response to COVID-19 restrictions that prevented her from travelling to external studios.

Discography

 Tug of War (2008)
 Kiss (2012)
 Emotion (2015)
 Dedicated (2019)
 Dedicated Side B (2020)
 The Loneliest Time (2022)

Tours

Headlining
 The Summer Kiss Tour (2013)
 Gimmie Love Tour (2015–2016)
 The Dedicated Tour (2019–2020)
 The So Nice Tour (2022–2023)

Co-headlining
 Marianas Trench, the New Cities and the Mission District – Beside You Tour (2009)

Opening act
 Hanson – Shout It Out World Tour (Canadian dates) (2012)
 Justin Bieber – Believe Tour (North American, European, and South American dates) (2012–2013)
 Hedley – Hello World Tour (Canadian dates) (2016)
 Katy Perry – Witness: The Tour (North American dates) (2018)

Filmography

References

External links

 
 
 
 
 

 
1985 births
Living people
21st-century Canadian singers
21st-century Canadian women singers
APRA Award winners
Canadian expatriate musicians in the United States
Canadian folk singer-songwriters
Canadian Idol participants
Canadian people of Danish descent
Canadian people of English descent
Canadian people of Scottish descent
Canadian sopranos
Canadian women activists
Canadian women pop singers
Canadian women singer-songwriters
Dance-pop musicians
Fontana North artists
Interscope Records artists
Juno Award for Album of the Year winners
Juno Award for Pop Album of the Year winners
Juno Award for Single of the Year winners
Canadian LGBT rights activists
MapleMusic Recordings artists
MTV Europe Music Award winners
Musicians from British Columbia
People from Mission, British Columbia
Pop rock singers
Schoolboy Records artists